Octavian Valentin Drăghici (born 26 November 1985) is a Romanian football player who plays for Austrian club SV Rottenmann. He made his debut in Liga I on 15 August 2008, in a match between CS Otopeni and FC Timișoara.

Honours

Club
Fortuna Covaci
 Liga III (1): 2008–09
ASU Politehnica Timișoara
Liga IV Timiș County: 2014–15

References

External links
 
 

1985 births
Living people
Sportspeople from Timișoara
Romanian footballers
Association football defenders
Liga I players
Liga II players
CS Otopeni players
CSP UM Timișoara players
ACS Fortuna Covaci players
FC UTA Arad players
FC Universitatea Cluj players
CS Gaz Metan Mediaș players
FC Olt Slatina players
SSU Politehnica Timișoara players
ACS Poli Timișoara players
FC Ripensia Timișoara players
Racing Club Beirut players
CSC Dumbrăvița players
Romanian expatriate footballers
Romanian expatriate sportspeople in Lebanon
Expatriate footballers in Lebanon
Lebanese Premier League players